Kim Cheol-ho (김철호; born September 26, 1983) is a South Korean football player.

Summary 
Kim is a very versatile defensive midfielder who is good at defense and passing based on his amount of activity.

Club career 
In 2003, Kim joined South Korea Futsal National Team, and in 2004, he got the recommendation of the head coach of the Futsal National team and entered into Seongnam Ilhwa Chunma with the signing fee USD 100,000. Coaches said that he was really impressive with his amount of activity. Even though he was not the first squad member in year 2004, he became the first squad from the next year, 2005. Year 2006, he did 26 appearances and the Seongnam Ilhwa won K League champion and League cup runner-up. The most impressive time is that he scored at AFC Final match versus Zob Ahan in year 2010. Due to this goal, Seongnam Ilhwa won AFC Champion as the second time. After that, he entered Sangju Sangmu for his military service. 
After finishing his military service, he back to Seongnam Ilhwa and played as the defensive midfielder. He scored 2 goals among 3 goals of team's total until 10 round of the league. His performance was prodigious in terms of both quantity and quality with his veteran experience.

League statistics 

{| border=1 cellpadding=4 cellspacing=2 style="background:#FFFFFF; text-align:center; font-size: 95%; border: 1px #aaaaaa solid; border-collapse: collapse; clear:center"
|- style="background:#C0C0C0"
!Club !!League !!Year !! Apps !! Sub !! Goal !! Assist !! Y/C !! R/C 
|-
| rowspan="7"|Seongnam Ilhwa || rowspan="10"|K League||2004 ||18||4||0||2||3||0 
|-
| 2005 ||33||8||1||0||4||0 
|-
| 2006 ||26||8||1||1||5||0 
|-
| 2007 ||9||4||1||0||2||0 
|-
| 2008 ||29||14||0||2||6||0 
|-
| 2009 ||32||22||0||0||3||0 
|-
| 2010 ||27||19||3||2||3||0 
|-
| rowspan="2"|Sangju Sangmu || 2011 ||29||7||1||4||4||0 
|-
| 2012 ||19||10||2||0||1||0 
|-
|rowspan="3"| Seongnam Ilhwa || 2012 ||7||5||0||1||3||0 
|-
| rowspan="2"|K League Classic||2013 ||29||9||1||2||5||1
|-
|2014 ||10||0||2||0||0||0
|-
! Total (K League) ||K League Classic|| - ||268||110|| 12||14||39||1 
|}
League records include K-League Cup. As of April 28th, 2014

Honors

Club
Seongnam Ilhwa Chunma
 K League (1): 2006
 League Cup (1): 2004
 AFC Champions League (1): 2010

References

External links

1983 births
Living people
South Korean footballers
Seongnam FC players
Gimcheon Sangmu FC players
Kim Cheol-ho
Suwon FC players
K League 1 players
Expatriate footballers in Thailand
Sportspeople from South Gyeongsang Province
Association football midfielders
South Korean expatriate footballers
South Korean expatriate sportspeople in Thailand